Middle River, formerly Middle River Village, is an unincorporated settlement at the mouth of the Middle River at its mouth into Trembleur Lake in Omineca Country of the Central Interior of British Columbia, Canada.  The community includes Dzitline Lee Indian Reserve 9, which is located on the left bank of the mouth of the Middle River.

References

Unincorporated settlements in British Columbia
Omineca Country
Populated places in the Regional District of Bulkley-Nechako
Dakelh communities